The 1992 Georgia Tech Yellow Jackets football team represented the Georgia Institute of Technology during the 1992 NCAA Division I-A football season. The Yellow Jackets were led by first-year head coach Bill Lewis and played their home games at Bobby Dodd Stadium in Atlanta. They competed as members of the Atlantic Coast Conference, finishing tied for fourth with a final record of 5–6 (4–4 ACC).

Schedule

Sources:

Roster

References

Georgia Tech
Georgia Tech Yellow Jackets football seasons
Georgia Tech Yellow Jackets football